Geritola cyanea is a butterfly in the family Lycaenidae. It is found in Cameroon, the Central African Republic, the Democratic Republic of the Congo and Uganda.

Details
This Butterfly's scientific name Geritola cyanea
And belongs to the Lycaenidae Family

Locations
This Butterfly can be found in Cameroon, the Central African Republic, the Democratic Republic of the Congo and Uganda.

References

Butterflies described in 1964
Poritiinae